Bahram Rashidi Farrokhi is an Iranian football forward who plays for Foolad in the Persian Gulf Pro League.

References

1992 births
Living people
People from Kerman
Iranian footballers
Association football forwards
People from Kerman Province
Mes Rafsanjan players
Foolad FC players